Camilo Blanes Cortés (16 September 1946 – 8 September 2019), known professionally as Camilo Sesto "El Rey del Amor", was a Spanish singer, songwriter and music producer. There are various sales figures for him, ranging from 70 to 200 million records sold, and the singer himself claimed to have sold more than 175 million records. However, his official sales would represent around than 2.8 million copies worldwide, including nearly 900,000 certified.

Biographical summary 
Sesto sang in two pop bands during the 1960s and won a contest in a Madrid television show. He played a part in the Spanish filming of Shakespeare's Hamlet. Later, he teamed up with singer and producer Juan Pardo, but success would come on its own accord, with his own music works. 

As a composer, Sesto wrote songs for artists such as Ángela Carrasco, Miguel Bosé, Lucía Méndez, Charytín Goyco and José José, among others. He also produced and translated to Spanish the lyrics of an album by the popular Australian rock band Air Supply. Throughout his career, he remained one of the most influential pioneer artists of pop and rock in Spanish, that would inspire many newer acts in the Latin music world as well as across Europe, the Americas and Asia.

Career
The mid-sixties marked the beginning of Sesto's career. After producing his first record with his band Los Dayson, in 1965 they traveled to Madrid to appear on Televisión Española's Salto a la Fama. In 1966, Sesto joined another band, Los Botines, whose music was influenced by The Beatles. In 1967, the band appeared in the film Los chicos del Preu. At the beginning (1969) he participated in the chorus of the song "O Tren" by Andrés do Barro, produced by Juan Pardo. In 1970, he recorded various singles including: "Llegará el Verano" and "Sin Dirección", with the artistic name "Camilo Sexto". He became his own producer, as well as the producer of other artists. His solo career started in 1970, the same year he won the "Revelación" price, at the "Olés de la Canción" festival.

After meeting producer,  in 1972, he launched a solo career under the stage name Camilo Sesto. He appeared on Spanish TV's program "Buenas Noches" singing "Algo de Mí" (his first No.1 record). Algo de Mi reached the Number 1 slot in Spain and most of the Spanish speaking world, and it maintained that top position for a whole year in most of Latin-America. In 1973, he represented Spain with the song "Algo Más" in the second edition of the OTI Festival, which was held in the Brazilian city of Belo Horizonte. In 1974, his success as a pop singer continued with record sales escalating rapidly. His concerts took him around the world with such songs as "¿Quieres ser mi amante?", "Llueve sobre mojado", "Yo soy así", "Isabel", "Déjame participar en tu juego" and "Mienteme". "¿Quieres ser mi amante?" received a Grammy nomination for Best Latin Recording in 1976. He has received several platinum certifications.

On 6 November 1975, Sesto starred in the role of Jesus on the Spanish version/adaptation by Jaime Azpilicueta of the rock opera Jesus Christ Superstar at the Alcalá-Palace Theatre in Madrid (Spain). The production was very costly as he financed it entirely. His work was a success and received positive reviews. The public filled the theatre and shows were extended to four months. Both in terms of interpretation and musically speaking, Sesto's show was considered of great quality. Andrew Lloyd Webber admitted that this was the only production that could equal the original American version.

After successfully starring in the Spanish version of "Jesus Christ Superstar" catapulted him to superstardom, Sesto continued gaining fame as a singer and composer. Notable hits from Sesto include "Vivir Así es Morir de Amor", "Jamás", "Perdóname", "Melina" (a song about Melina Mercouri), and "Donde Estes, Con Quien Estes". Sesto went through a retirement in 1987 until he returned to the music scene in 1991. That year, he released A Voluntad del Cielo (Heaven Willing). The album's lead single, "Amor Mío, ¿Qué Me Has Hecho?" (My love, what have you done to me?), reached number one on the Billboard Hot Latin Songs chart in the United States. The track was nominated for Pop Song of the Year at the Lo Nuestro Awards of 1992 and the American Society of Composers, Authors and Publishers Latin Awards of 1993, respectively.

He survived a liver transplant in August 2001 and released an album, Alma, two years later. Sesto returned to the stage in 2004 at the Viña del Mar International Song Festival in Chile. Sesto won many awards at Viña del Mar in 2004. His last musical work was the singing of Bujalance's football team's hymn.

In 2008, Camilo announced his retirement from the studio, and in September 2009 he announced that he would go on a farewell tour. He would tour the Americas (United States, Mexico, Peru, Chile, Ecuador, Colombia, and other countries) for the next two years. In October 2010, he gave his last two concerts in Madrid, which were released as his first "live" (and also last) album. A live DVD called "Todo de Mí" recorded in Madrid, was released around the same time.

In 2011, he was awarded the "Highest Hispanic Pride" medal in Las Vegas, U.S. That day was proclaimed 28 may Camilo Sesto's Day in Nevada.

Controversies
In 2011, there were rumours of another Sesto "farewell tour", that some news media called "La Gira del Adiós" ("The Farewell Tour"). Allegedly, tour dates were made, radio stations spoke about it, tickets were sold, etc. There were many convincing ads in local newspapers, and magazines. However, Sesto later communicated that this was nothing but a "hoax" to get people to buy fake tickets for a tour that he himself was not even aware of. Many radio stations and music media threatened to take legal action against the singer if he would not "meet with the responsibility", and Sesto was forced to once again come back into the media to try to clear his name. The courts ruled in favour of some institutions that eventually did sue.

Death
Sesto died on 8 September 2019 at a Madrid hospital from kidney failure, eight days shy of his 73rd birthday. He was due to release a new album on 13 September, as well as embark in a tour in the United States the following month. Spain's acting Prime Minister Pedro Sánchez wrote on Twitter: "Spain and all of Latin America mourn the loss of Camilo Sesto. His melodies will always be part of our memory."

Legacy
From the 1970s to 2000s Sesto created many hit songs, with almost everyone coming from his own inspiration, being the author, performer, composer, and producer of all his works. Camilo Sesto has the record of two presentations daily for 20 consecutive days at Madison Square Garden in the 1980s. 
And thousands of awards and recognitions among the most prominent:
Fitur.- The Commonwealth of Alto Guadalquivir Spain appoints Camilo Sesto cultural ambassador 2007
València (EP). The Council of Ministers, at the proposal of the Minister of Culture and Sports, José Guirao, has approved this September 13 by Royal Decree the posthumous award of the "Medal of Merit in Fine Arts", in its category of Gold, to the singer, composer and performer Camilo Blanes Cortés, 'Camilo Sesto'.
Dove of Peace Award, Camilo sesto 2016
For his part, Father Ángel, who has welcomed this act in his Church, has described it as "privilege" to be able to count on Camilo Sesto, whom at other times they were going to see in Jesus Christ Superstar. He has also highlighted the importance of the prayer of the Our Father and has called for "bread, justice, and forgiveness for all." In addition, during the presentation, the priest has delivered the singer of the Dove of Peace.
Alameda Camilo Sesto inaugurates an avenue with his name in Alcoy 2018
This inauguration will take place two years after Camilo Blanes Cortés (the real name of the artist) received the Alcoyana Gold Medal and also be proclaimed a Favorite Son of this city.
Alameda Camilo Sesto inaugurates an avenue with his name in Alcoy 2018

Most of Sesto's works are in Spanish, but he has also recorded songs in English, Valencian, Italian, German, Japanese and Portuguese. Camilo has released at least one album in English. With a frenetic level of activity in the 1970s and 1980s, he remains one of the artists with the most number 1 hits (totaling 52). His albums had sold over 180 million copies by 2019. In 2017, Sesto was inducted into the Latin Songwriters Hall of Fame.

Discography
Studio albums

 Llegará El Verano/Sin Dirección (1970) (Movieplay)
 Algo De Mí (1972) (Pronto)
 Solo un Hombre (1972) (Pronto)
 Algo Más (album) (1973) (Pronto)
 Camilo (1974) (Pronto)
 Amor Libre (1975) (Pronto)
 Jesucristo Superstar  (1975) (Pronto)
 Memorias  (1976) (Pronto)
 Rasgos (1977) (Pronto)
 Entre Amigos (1977) (Pronto)
 Sentimientos (1978) (Pronto)
 Horas de amor (1979) (Pronto)
 Amaneciendo (1980) (Pronto)
 Más y Más (1981) (Pronto)
 Con Ganas (1982) (Pronto)
 Amanecer/84 (1984) (Ariola)
 Tuyo (1985) (Ariola)
 Agenda De Baile (1986) (Ariola)
 A Voluntad del Cielo (1991) (Ariola)
 Huracán De Amor (1992) (Ariola)
 Amor Sin Vértigo (1994) (BMG Ariola)
  Camilo Superstar (1997)
 Alma'' (2002) (Elica)

References

External links

International Jose Guilermo Carrillo Foundation (Archive.org)
Famousvalencianos.com
Cmtv.com

1946 births
2019 deaths
People from Alcoy
Singers from the Valencian Community
Latin music songwriters
Spanish male composers
Spanish male singers
Spanish singer-songwriters
Spanish-language singers
Sony Music Spain artists
Spanish tenors